Sköna juveler is a 1984 Swedish film directed by Hans Iveberg.

Plot summary

Cast 
Lena Nyman as Lee
Kim Anderzon as Veronika
Kent Andersson as Martin
Johannes Brost as Harry Jansson
Brasse Brännström as Oscar
Janne 'Loffe' Carlsson as Larsson
Ernst Günther as Gustav
Margaretha Krook as Old Woman
Carl-Gustaf Lindstedt as Boris
Örjan Ramberg as Jan Asp
David Wilson as Ben Hudson
Jan Arrendal as Short man
Birgit Eggers as Johan's mother
Per Eggers as Johan
Basia Frydman
Harald Hamrell as Sentry
Lars Hansson as Tall Man
Michael Kallaanvaara
Leif Magnusson as Nicke
Tomas Norström
Börje Nyberg
Peter Schildt
Michael Segerström as Preacher
Lennart R. Svensson
Marvin Yxner as Sentry

Soundtrack

External links 

1984 films
Swedish comedy films
1980s mystery films
Swedish thriller films
Comedy thriller films
1980s Swedish films